Pentaplaris huaoranica is a species of flowering plant in the family Malvaceae. It is found only in Ecuador. Its natural habitat is subtropical or tropical moist lowland forests.

References

Bombacoideae
Near threatened plants
Endemic flora of Ecuador
Taxonomy articles created by Polbot